In geometry, a cyclogon is the curve traced by  a vertex of a polygon that rolls without slipping along a straight line. There are no restrictions on the nature of the polygon. It can be a regular polygon like an equilateral triangle or a square. The polygon need not even be convex: it could even be a star-shaped polygon. More generally, the curves traced by points other than vertices have also been considered. In such cases it would be assumed that the tracing point is rigidly attached to the polygon. If the tracing point is located outside the polygon, then the curve is called a prolate cyclogon, and if it lies inside the polygon it is called a curtate cyclogon.

In the limit, as the number of sides increases to infinity, the cyclogon becomes a cycloid.

The cyclogon has an interesting property regarding its area. Let  denote the area of the region above the line and below one of the arches, let  denote the area of the rolling polygon, and let  denote the area of the disk that circumscribes the
polygon.  For every cyclogon generated by a regular polygon,

Examples

Cyclogons generated by an equilateral triangle and a square

Prolate cyclogon generated by an equilateral triangle

Curtate cyclogon generated by an equilateral triangle

Cyclogons generated by quadrilaterals

Generalized cyclogons
A cyclogon is obtained when a polygon rolls over a straight line. Let it be assumed that the regular polygon rolls over the edge of another polygon. Let it also be assumed that the tracing point is not a point on the boundary of the polygon but possibly a point within the polygon or outside the polygon but lying in the plane of the polygon. In this more general situation, let a curve be traced by a point z on a regular polygonal disk with n sides rolling around another regular polygonal disk with m sides. The edges of the two regular polygons are assumed to have the same length. A point z attached rigidly to the n-gon traces out an arch consisting of n circular arcs before repeating the pattern periodically. This curve is called a trochogon — an epitrochogon if the n-gon rolls outside the m-gon, and a hypotrochogon if it rolls inside the m-gon. The trochogon is curtate if z is inside the n-gon, and prolate (with loops) if z is outside the n-gon. If z is at a vertex it traces an epicyclogon or a hypocyclogon.

See also
Cycloid
Epicycloid
Hypocycloid

References

Roulettes (curve)
Piecewise-circular curves